Couratari calycina is a species of woody plant in the family Lecythidaceae. It is found only in Guyana.

References

calycina
Flora of Guyana
Vulnerable plants
Taxonomy articles created by Polbot